Olkkonen is a Finnish surname. Notable people with the surname include:

 Aate Olkkonen (1877–1949), Finnish politician
 Joonas Olkkonen (born 1976), Finnish sport shooter

See also
 Marjatta Muttilainen-Olkkonen (born 1946), Finnish cross-country skier

Finnish-language surnames